Run Cold is the third full-length album from Diva Destruction.

Track listing
"Run Cold"– 4:17
"Rewriting History"– 4:43
"The 4th Knife"– 3:56
"Electric Air"– 4:06
"Escape"– 4:44
"Subterfuge"– 4:23
"Screaming Inside"– 4:39
"Illusion's End"– 4:31
"Kiss The Stars"– 4:06
"Safe With Me"– 4:29
"Resolution"– 3:47

Info

 All tracks written, performed, and produced by Debra Fogarty.

External links
 Diva Destruction Discography Info

2006 albums
Alice In... albums
Diva Destruction albums